Felix Erbert (born 9 June 1918) was a Czech swimmer. He competed in the men's 200 metre breaststroke at the 1936 Summer Olympics.

References

External links
 

1918 births
Possibly living people
Czech male swimmers
Olympic swimmers of Czechoslovakia
Swimmers at the 1936 Summer Olympics
Place of birth missing